John Sharratt (29 October 1850 – 1892) was an English cricketer who played first-class cricket for North of England in 1880.

Sharratt was born at  Derby and was a railway worker. In 1879 he played two matches for Derbyshire which were not first-class status, In 1880 he played one first-class match as wicket-keeper for the North of England.

Sharratt played 2 innings in one first-class match with an average of 3.00 and a top score of five. As wicket-keeper he took two first-class wickets by stumping.

Sharratt died in the Shardlow district at the age of 41.

References

External links

1850 births
1892 deaths
Cricketers from Derby
English cricketers
North v South cricketers